The 92nd 2018 Lunar New Year Cup, is the annual football event held in Hong Kong to celebrate Chinese New Year. The event was held by the Hong Kong Football Association. 2matches were played.

Teams
First match (90 minutes): 
  Hong Kong Women's Representative Team
  Armed Police Force of Nepal (Women)

Final match (90 minutes): 
  Hong Kong Representative Team
  Hong Kong League XI

Squads

Hong Kong Women's Representative Team
Manager:  José Ricardo Rambo

Armed Police Force of Nepal (Women)
Manager:

Hong Kong Representative Team
Manager:  Liu Chun Fai

Hong Kong League XI
Manager:  Kwok Kar Lok

Results

First match

Final match

References

Lunar New Year Cup
Lunar
February 2018 sports events in China